On 13 August 2019, lone attacker Mert Ney was charged with the murder of Michaela Dunn, whom was alleged to have been involved in sex work in his apartment room. After the murder of Dunn, Ney walked onto York Street, indiscriminately stabbed Linda Bo with a kitchen knife, then proceeded to jump onto random vehicles, yelling profanities and threatening civilians. After an approximate 150 metre chase through the CBD following the stabbing of Linda Bo, Ney was restrained by civilians using assorted furniture. Ney's lawyers defended the charges against him on the grounds of mental illness, and he was sentenced to 44 years in prison in May 2021.

Motive 
While a motive for Mert Ney's attack was investigated but not determined, the link towards severe mental illness remained constant. A Sydney Court reported that 1500 pages of Ney's medical reports were collected.

A USB stick was located on Ney's person, that contained information and video files involving the Christchurch mosque shootings and other similar acts of terrorism. After the attack on 13 August, Ney was additionally charged for possessing child abuse material on a USB. This discovery provided a link to possible terrorism organisations, additionally supported by Ney's expression of "Allahu Akbar" during the attack. Whilst the proclamation does not directly tie to terrorism, this has been defended by his lawyers as a consequence of his mental illness and viewing other terrorist attacks.

Ney refers to himself as "psycho" in the Facebook post involving Michaela Dunn's murder in his apartment room.

Correlations to suicide by cop were made due to the repeated statement of "shoot me" being made by Ney during the public standoff with civilians.

Sentencing 
On 14 May 2021, Justice Peter Johnson of the New South Wales Supreme Court sentenced Mert Ney to 44 years in prison with a non-parole period of 33 years. The sentence took into account previous charges Ney has been found guilty of such as common assault on his sister Yazel. The sentence received a 10% discount as per Ney's guilty plea.

References 

2019 in Australia
2019 crimes in Australia
August 2019 crimes in Oceania
August 2019 events in Australia
Murder in Sydney
Stabbing attacks in 2019
Stabbing attacks in Australia